The ISSUE Project Room (often shortened to ISSUE) is a music venue in Brooklyn, New York, founded in 2003 by Suzanne Fiol.  Located in 110 Livingston Street in Downtown Brooklyn, the venue supports a wide variety of contemporary performance, specializing in presenting experimental and avant-garde music. ISSUE Project Room is an art and performance center, presenting projects by more than 200 emerging and established artists each year.

History and programming

ISSUE Project Room began in 2003 with a special concert curated by ISSUE's late founder Suzanne Fiol and musician Marc Ribot honoring the work of Frantz Casseus, the father of Haitian Classical music. It started out in a garage space in the East Village of Manhattan, as a "project room" to feature experimental performances presented by Fiol's photography agency, Issue Management. Performances by Debbie Harry and the Jazz Passengers, Elliott Sharp, Anthony Coleman and dozens of others soon followed. Responding to the needs of artists in the community, Suzanne committed herself to developing ISSUE into a year-round performance space where artists could present their most challenging new work.

By 2005, ISSUE was presenting 100 arts events annually featuring pioneering artists from all disciplines. It had outgrown its Lower East Side location, and moved to a unique space in Brooklyn: a two-story silo in the post-industrial margin of the Gowanus Canal. At the Silo, ISSUE's programming expanded to include site-specific works that incorporated a custom-designed 16-channel hemispherical speaker system created by sound artist Stephan Moore. Success in the space, both critical and programmatic, was tremendous, but after two years its rent was doubled and ISSUE was forced to move on.

In 2007, ISSUE moved to the Old American Can Factory, where it continued to thrive — emerging as one of Brooklyn's leading cultural catalysts and bringing 10,000 people to the Gowanus area of Brooklyn each year.

By 2008, ISSUE was supporting new work by more than 200 innovative arts each year, and entered and won a competition for a twenty-year rent-free lease to the 4,800 sq. ft. theater located at 22 Boerum Place— on the ground floor of the historic Beaux-Arts McKim, Mead & White “110 Livingston Street” building in downtown Brooklyn, to create a "Carnegie Hall for the avant-garde". This tremendous award was a strong recognition of the crucial role ISSUE will play in shaping the future of Brooklyn and maintaining New York City's status as a cultural leader.

Tragically, in late 2008, ISSUE's founder Suzanne Fiol was diagnosed with cancer. She lost her courageous battle in October 2009.

From 2009-2010, committed to achieving the founder's vision of creating ISSUE into a permanent home for experimental arts culture, its board, staff, and the artist community continued to evolve and expand ISSUE's programming. New music premiered in June presented by Zach Layton and Nick Hallett including a performance of Anthony Braxton's new opera Trillium E, an evening of keyboard music including a rare performance of Pauline Oliveros's eight-handed piano piece "Gathering Together", and the New York City premiere of two works by French electro-acoustic pioneer Luc Ferrari.

In 2012, ISSUE moved all programs to its theater space at 22 Boerum Place to present 150 pre-construction concerts while working with NYC Department of Design and Construction to prepare for renovations. Notable performances at the Boerum Place theater include Cecil Taylor's first ever performance in his home-town of Brooklyn, a three-night series of Philip Glass in collaboration with Stephin Merritt, Laurie Anderson, and Jon Gibson, Keiji Haino performing solo and in a rare duo with Fushitsusha founding member Tamio Shiraishi, and the PAN_ACT festival— which brought together over 30 artists in conjunction with the Berlin-based label PAN.

ISSUE completed its capital campaign in 2012 by raising over $4,000,000 to renovate its space into the last section, scheduled to begin in 2014.

References

External links 

ISSUE Project Room on Tumblr - official blog

2003 establishments in New York City
Culture of Brooklyn
Music venues in Brooklyn